Magor services (in Welsh: Gwasanaethau Magwyr) is a motorway service station on the M4, located just off junction 23A, at Magor near Newport, in Monmouthshire, South Wales.

History
The services opened in 1996 along with the Second Severn Crossing and was first operated by the Granada group. Subsequently managed by First, the services became dilapidated and lacking in facilities and in April 2007 were voted the worst in Britain by members of Vans United. In August 2011, it was announced that Magor services had been sold to Roadchef.

References

External links 
Motorway Services Online — Magor

1996 establishments in Wales
M4 motorway service stations
Buildings and structures in Monmouthshire
Transport in Monmouthshire
Motorways in Wales